In elementary algebra, the binomial theorem (or binomial expansion) describes the algebraic expansion of powers of a binomial.

These coefficients for varying  and  can be arranged to form Pascal's triangle. These numbers also occur in combinatorics, where  gives the number of different combinations of  elements that can be chosen from an -element set. Therefore  is often pronounced as " choose ".

History
Special cases of the binomial theorem were known since at least the 4th century BC when Greek mathematician Euclid mentioned the special case of the binomial theorem for exponent .  There is evidence that the binomial theorem for cubes was known by the 6th century AD in India.

Binomial coefficients, as combinatorial quantities expressing the number of ways of selecting  objects out of  without replacement, were of interest to ancient Indian mathematicians.  The earliest known reference to this combinatorial problem is the Chandaḥśāstra by the Indian lyricist Pingala (c. 200 BC), which contains a method for its solution.  The commentator Halayudha from the 10th century AD explains this method.  By the 6th century AD, the Indian mathematicians probably knew how to express this as a quotient , and a clear statement of this rule can be found in the 12th century text Lilavati by Bhaskara.

The first formulation of the binomial theorem and the table of binomial coefficients, to our knowledge, can be found in a work by Al-Karaji, quoted by Al-Samaw'al in his "al-Bahir". Al-Karaji described the triangular pattern of the binomial coefficients and also provided a mathematical proof of both the binomial theorem and Pascal's triangle, using an early form of mathematical induction.   The Persian poet and mathematician Omar Khayyam was probably familiar with the formula to higher orders, although many of his mathematical works are lost.  The binomial expansions of small degrees were known in the 13th century mathematical works of Yang Hui and also Chu Shih-Chieh.  Yang Hui attributes the method to a much earlier 11th century text of Jia Xian, although those writings are now also lost.

Blaise Pascal studied the eponymous triangle comprehensively in his Traité du triangle arithmétique. However, the pattern of numbers was already known to the European mathematicians of the late Renaissance,  including Stifel, Niccolò Fontana Tartaglia, and Simon Stevin.

Isaac Newton is generally credited with the generalized binomial theorem, valid for any rational exponent.

Statement 
According to the theorem, it is possible to expand any nonnegative integer power of  into a sum of the form

where  is an integer and each  is a positive integer known as a binomial coefficient. (When an exponent is zero, the corresponding power expression is taken to be 1 and this multiplicative factor is often omitted from the term. This formula is also referred to as the binomial formula or the binomial identity. Using summation notation, it can be written as

In this form, the formula reads

or equivalently

or more explicitly

Examples 

Here are the first few cases of the binomial theorem:

 the coefficients form the th row of Pascal's triangle;
 before combining like terms, there are  terms  in the expansion (not shown); 

A simple example with a specific positive value of :

A simple example with a specific negative value of :

Geometric explanation 

With , the theorem states that a cube of side  can be cut into a cube of side , a cube of side , three  rectangular boxes, and three  rectangular boxes.

Substituting this into the definition of the derivative via a difference quotient and taking limits means that the higher order terms,  and higher, become negligible, and yields the formula  interpreted as
If one integrates this picture, which corresponds to applying the fundamental theorem of calculus, one obtains Cavalieri's quadrature formula, the integral  – see proof of Cavalieri's quadrature formula for details.

Binomial coefficients 

The coefficients that appear in the binomial expansion are called binomial coefficients. These are usually written  and pronounced " choose ".

Formulas 

which is defined in terms of the factorial function . Equivalently, this formula can be written

with  factors in both the numerator and denominator of the fraction. Although this formula involves a fraction, the binomial coefficient  is actually an integer.

Combinatorial interpretation 
The binomial coefficient  can be interpreted as the number of ways to choose  elements from an -element set. This is related to binomials for the following reason: if we write  as a product

For example, there will only be one term , corresponding to choosing  from each binomial. Therefore, after combining like terms, the coefficient of  will be equal to the number of ways to choose exactly  elements from an -element set.

Proofs

Combinatorial proof

Example 

equals  because there are three  strings of length 3 with exactly two s, namely,

General case 
For a given , the following are proved equal in succession:
 the number of -character  strings having  in exactly  positions
 the number of -element subsets of 
  either by definition, or by a short combinatorial argument if one is defining  as 
This proves the binomial theorem.

Inductive proof 
Induction yields another proof of the binomial theorem. The identity

Now, the right hand side is

by Pascal's identity. Thus

Generalizations

Newton's generalized binomial theorem 

Around 1665, Isaac Newton generalized the binomial theorem to allow real exponents other than nonnegative integers. (The same generalization also applies to complex exponents.) In this generalization, the finite sum is replaced by an infinite series. In order to do this, one needs to give meaning to binomial coefficients with an arbitrary upper index, which cannot be done using the usual formula with factorials.  However, for an arbitrary number , one can define

where  is the Pochhammer symbol, here standing for a falling factorial. This agrees with the usual definitions when  is a nonnegative integer.

For example,  gives the following series for the square root:

Taking , the generalized binomial series gives the geometric series formula, valid for :

So, for instance, when ,

Replacing  with  yields:

So, for instance, when , we have for :

Further generalizations 

A version of the binomial theorem is valid for the following Pochhammer symbol-like family of polynomials: for a given real constant , define  and

for   Then

The case  recovers the usual binomial theorem.

More generally, a sequence  of polynomials is said to be of binomial type if
  for all ,
 , and
A sequence  is binomial if and only if its basis operator is a Delta operator.

Multinomial theorem 

The binomial theorem can be generalized to include powers of sums with more than two terms. The general version is

where the summation is taken over all sequences of nonnegative integer indices  through  such that the sum of all  is . (For each term in the expansion, the exponents must add up to ). The coefficients  are known as multinomial coefficients, and can be computed by the formula

Combinatorially, the multinomial coefficient  counts the number of different ways to partition an -element set into disjoint subsets of sizes .

Multi-binomial theorem 
When working in more dimensions, it is often useful to deal with products of binomial expressions. By the binomial theorem this is equal to

This may be written more concisely, by multi-index notation, as

General Leibniz rule 

The general Leibniz rule gives the th derivative of a product of two functions in a form similar to that of the binomial theorem: 

Here, the superscript  indicates the th derivative of a function.

Applications

Multiple-angle identities 
For the complex numbers the binomial theorem can be combined with de Moivre's formula to yield multiple-angle formulas for the sine and cosine. According to De Moivre's formula,

For example, since

De Moivre's formula tells us that

which are the usual double-angle identities. Similarly, since

De Moivre's formula yields

In general,

and

Series for e 
The number  is often defined by the formula

In particular:

The th term of this sum is

As , the rational expression on the right approaches , and therefore

This indicates that  can be written as a series:

Probability 
The binomial theorem is closely related to the probability mass function of the negative binomial distribution. The probability of a (countable) collection of independent Bernoulli trials  with probability of success  all not happening is

An upper bound for this quantity is

In abstract algebra 

For example, it holds for two  matrices, provided that those matrices commute; this is useful in computing powers of a matrix.

The binomial theorem can be stated by saying that the polynomial sequence   is of binomial type.

In popular culture 
 The binomial theorem is mentioned in the Major-General's Song in the comic opera The Pirates of Penzance.
 Professor Moriarty is described by Sherlock Holmes as having written a treatise on the binomial theorem.
 The Portuguese poet Fernando Pessoa, using the heteronym Álvaro de Campos, wrote that "Newton's Binomial is as beautiful as the Venus de Milo. The truth is that few people notice it."
 In the 2014 film The Imitation Game, Alan Turing makes reference to Isaac Newton's work on the binomial theorem during his first meeting with Commander Denniston at Bletchley Park.

See also 

 Binomial approximation
 Binomial distribution
 Binomial inverse theorem
 Stirling's approximation
 Tannery's theorem

Notes

References

Further reading

External links 

 
 Binomial Theorem by Stephen Wolfram, and "Binomial Theorem (Step-by-Step)" by Bruce Colletti and Jeff Bryant, Wolfram Demonstrations Project, 2007.

Factorial and binomial topics
Theorems about polynomials
Articles containing proofs